Sacca Fisola is an artificial island in the Venetian Lagoon.  It is a largely modern residential area.

Geography
Sacca Fisola lies at the western end of the Giudecca - to which it is connected by bridge - and north of Sacca San Biagio. It is home to a public swimming pool.

Festivals and events
The island has a weekly Thursday market.

Demographics
It has a reputation for the Communist leanings of its voting-age population.

Gallery

References

Geography of Venice
Islands of the Venetian Lagoon